Cisai-Saint-Aubin is a commune in the Orne department in north-western France. The French priest and palaeographer Robert Devreesse (1894–1978) was born in Cisai-Saint-Aubin.

See also
Communes of the Orne department

References

Cisaisaintaubin